On 5 May 2014, the cargo ship Zhong Xing 2 and the container ship MOL Motivator collided off Po Toi Island near Hong Kong, resulting in Zhong Xing 2 sinking. All but one of Zhong Xing 2 twelve-man crew were left missing and presumed dead; a rescue operation was conducted by Chinese authorities, and a fishing vessel rescued one man, Zhong Xing 2 sole survivor.

Background 
MOL Motivator was travelling from Hong Kong to Yantian, while Zhong Xing 2 was travelling from Hebei to Haikou.

Accident 
The collision occurred around 2:30 local time on the morning of 5 May,  to the southwest of Po Toi Island. Poor visibility has been blamed for the collision, after heavy rain fell through the night, and Hong Kong experienced a "powerful" thunderstorm. Heavy rainfall and lightning may have caused problems with the ships' radars.

Rescue efforts 
A fishing vessel passing by rescued a man in his forties from mainland China; 25 minutes later, he was taken to Ruttonjee Hospital, Wan Chai, where he was treated for minor scratches.

A rescue attempt spanning naval and aerial searching was launched, co-ordinated by the Guangdong Maritime Rescue Co-ordination Centre. A fixed-wing aeroplane, seven Hong Kong Marine Police vessels, three fireboats, two diving vessels and a helicopter belonging to the Government Flying Service of Hong Kong, more than ten Chinese vessels, and three Chinese helicopters, were sent in search of the missing vessel. The crew of a helicopter observed an oil slick and floating debris, but no survivors. It is considered possible that the ship sank with only one survivor, the other eleven men trapped on board, and they are "feared dead".

References 

Ships sunk in collisions
Maritime incidents in 2014
2014 in Hong Kong
Cargo ships
Container ships
May 2014 events in China
Shipwrecks of Hong Kong